John Stanley Francomb (1873–1915) was an English international rugby union forward who played club rugby for Manchester and Sale. Francomb played international rugby for the British Isles on their 1899 tour of Australia.

Rugby career
Of the 1899 touring British Team, Francomb is one of the least reported members. Tour captain Matthew Mullineux, described Francomb as 'an old Oxford man', though there is no record of him representing the Oxford University team in any of the Varsity Matches. Mullineux goes on to describe Francomb as '...very tall, and wants a lot of stopping when he gets "going"'; common traits for early forward players. At the time of the Australian tour, Francomb was playing club rugby for Manchester and county rugby for Lancashire.

Francomb played in nine matches of the Australia tour, which included one Test against the Australian national team. Francomb was not selected for the first game of the tour, but played in the second game against the New South Wales Waratahs. He kept his placed for the next game played against a Metropolitan team before he played his one and only international game, in the First Test against Australia. The tourists lost 13-3, and Mullineux reacted by dropping himself, Francomb and Esmond Martelli from future Test games. Despite being dropped from the Test games, Francomb played in six further matches against invitational and state teams.

During the 1898/99 season Francomb was also invited to join British touring team the Barbarians. The next notable rugby event Francomb was involved in took place six years later, when he was playing for Sale; he was chosen to play for the Cheshire team to face the 1905 New Zealand team on their tour of Britain.

Bibliography

References

1873 births
1915 deaths
Barbarian F.C. players
British & Irish Lions rugby union players from England
English rugby union players
Rugby union forwards
Rugby union players from Blackburn